

Films

References

 
2020
2020 in LGBT history
2020-related lists